Amirul bin Hamer (born 27 February 1998) is a Malaysian professional footballer who plays for Malaysia Premier League club Kelantan.

Club career

Melaka United
Amirul made his debut for the club in a Malaysia Super League match against Kedah Darul Aman on 12 September 2021.

References

External links

Living people
1998 births
People from Malacca
Malaysian people of Malay descent
Malaysian footballers
Melaka United F.C. players
Association football defenders
Association football midfielders